Massachusetts House of Representatives' 6th Norfolk district in the United States is one of 160 legislative districts included in the lower house of the Massachusetts General Court. It covers part of Norfolk County. Democrat William Galvin of Canton has represented the district since 1991.

2020 Democratic Primary 
Incumbent William Galvin has been opposed in the democratic primary for the first time in over a decade by Tamisha Civil. The election is set to occur on September 1, 2020, with early voting and mail-in voting options offered in greater variety due to COVID-19.

Towns represented
The district includes the following localities:
 Avon
 Canton
 part of Stoughton

The current district geographic boundary overlaps with that of the Massachusetts Senate's Norfolk, Bristol and Plymouth district.

Former locales
The district previously covered:
 Braintree, circa 1927 
 Quincy, circa 1872

Representatives
 Franklin Curtis, circa 1858 
 William S. Morton, circa 1859 
 Willard Franklin Gleason, circa 1888 
 Benjamin H. Woodsum, circa 1920 
 Francis Appleton Harding, circa 1951 
 Harold Putnam, circa 1951 
 Robert B. Ambler, circa 1975 
 Joseph Semensi
 John H. Flood
 William C. Galvin, 1991-current

Images
Portraits of legislators

See also
 List of Massachusetts House of Representatives elections
 Other Norfolk County districts of the Massachusetts House of Representatives: 1st, 2nd, 3rd, 4th, 5th, 7th, 8th, 9th, 10th, 11th, 12th, 13th, 14th, 15th
 List of Massachusetts General Courts
 List of former districts of the Massachusetts House of Representatives

References

Further reading

External links
 Ballotpedia
  (State House district information based on U.S. Census Bureau's American Community Survey).
 League of Women Voters of Sharon-Stoughton

House
Government of Norfolk County, Massachusetts